The Pennine Ridge Stakes is a Grade II American Thoroughbred horse race for horses aged three years old over a distance of one and one-eighth miles on the inner turf held annually in late May or early June at Belmont Park in Elmont, New York.  The event currently carries a purse of $200,000.

History

The race was inaugurated in 2014 with a stakes purse of $200,000.

In 2016 the event was classified as Grade III.

The race is named after the Graded stakes winner Pennine Ridge who in 1994 won the Jamaica Handicap, Hill Prince Stakes and Choice Handicap.

The event is considered a preparatory race for the Belmont Derby which is held in July.

In 2020 due to the COVID-19 pandemic in the United States, NYRA schedule the event at a shorter distance of one mile. 

In 2021 the event was moved off the turf due to the inclement weather which affected the turf course. Subsequently the event was downgraded to Grade III.

Records
Speed record: 
1:45.78  – Catholic Boy  (2018)

Largest margin of victory:
  lengths – Decorated Invader (2020)

Most wins by a jockey:
 2 – Javier Castellano (2018, 2019)
 2 – Joel Rosario (2020, 2021)
 2 – Irad Ortiz Jr. (2016, 2022)

Most wins by a trainer:
 3 – Todd A. Pletcher (2014, 2021, 2022)

Most wins by an owner:
 2 – WinStar Farm (2021, 2022)
 2 – Siena Farm (2018, 2022)

Winners

Legend:

See also
 List of American and Canadian Graded races

References

Graded stakes races in the United States
2014 establishments in New York (state)
Recurring sporting events established in 2014
Horse races in New York (state)
Flat horse races for three-year-olds
Grade 2 stakes races in the United States
Turf races in the United States